Jacques Daniel-Norman (real name Joseph Jacques Compère (2 December 1901 – 5 December 1978) was a French film director and screenwriter.

Filmography

Director 

 1937 : Si tu reviens
 1938 : Prince de mon cœur
 1940 : Marseille mes amours
 1941 : Le Briseur de chaînes
 1942 : La Loi du printemps
 1943 : Ne le criez pas sur les toits
 1944 : L'aventure est au coin de la rue
 1946 : 120, rue de la Gare
 1946 : Monsieur Grégoire s'évade
 1947 : The Three Cousins
 1948 : Le Diamant de cent sous
 1948 : Si ça peut vous faire plaisir
 1948 : The Woman I Murdered
 1949 : The Red Angel
 1951 : Cœur-sur-Mer
 1951 : Dakota 308
 1952 : Son dernier Noël
 1954 : Tourments
 1961 : Alerte au barrage

Screenwriter 
(of his own films unless otherwise stated)

 1935 : Un soir de bombe by Maurice Cammage
 1936 : Une femme qui se partage by Maurice Cammage
 1936 : Bach the Detective by René Pujol 
 1937 : La Belle de Montparnasse by Maurice Cammage
 1938 : Prince de mon cœur 
 1940 : Marseille mes amours 
 1942 : La Loi du printemps 
 1944 : L'aventure est au coin de la rue
 1946 : 120, rue de la Gare
 1946 : Monsieur Grégoire s'évade 
 1947 : Les Trois Cousines 
 1948 : Si ça peut vous faire plaisir 
 1949 : Les Nouveaux Maîtres by Paul Nivoix
 1949 : L'Ange rouge 
 1951 : Cœur-sur-Mer 
 1952 : Son dernier Noël
 1954 : Tourments

References

External links 
 
 29 films liés à Jacques Daniel-Norman sur Ciné-Ressources.net
 Jacques Daniel-Norman sur Unifrance.org 
  Jacques Daniel-Norman on Data.bnf.fr

French film directors
20th-century French screenwriters
Mass media people from Lyon
1901 births
1978 deaths